There's No Place Like America Today is the seventh studio album by Curtis Mayfield, released in 1975 on Curtom Records. It peaked at number 120 on the Billboard 200 chart, as well as number 13 on the Top R&B/Hip-Hop Albums chart.

Album cover
The album cover was based on a 1937 monochrome photograph by Margaret Bourke-White, titled At the Time of the Louisville Flood, on which the advertising slogan was "There's No Way Like the American Way". The original photograph was published in the February 15, 1937 edition of Life magazine.

Critical reception

The album was featured in 1001 Albums You Must Hear Before You Die. In 2013, NME placed it at number 373 on the "500 Greatest Albums of All Time" list.

Track listing

Personnel
Credits adapted from liner notes.

 Curtis Mayfield – vocals, guitar, keyboards, production
 Rich Tufo – keyboards, arrangement
 Gary Thompson – guitar
 Phil Upchurch – guitar
 Joseph "Lucky" Scott – bass guitar
 Quinton Joseph – drums
 Henry Gibson – percussion
 Harold Dessent - woodwinds
 Roger Anfinsen – engineering
 Ed Thrasher – art direction
 Peter Palombi – illustration
 Lockart – design
 Marv Stuart – management

Charts

References

External links
 
 There's No Place Like America Today (Adobe Flash) at Radio3Net (streamed copy where licensed)

1975 albums
Curtis Mayfield albums
Albums produced by Curtis Mayfield
Curtom Records albums